A brush cut is a type of haircut in which the hair on the top of the head is cut  short in every dimension. The hair below the upper portion of the sides and back of the head is tapered short or semi-short with a clipper, in the same manner as a crew cut. A variant form may have a slight graduation of the top hair longer from back  to front or a quickly graduated bit of hair at the front hairline to achieve a little flip up of the hair at the forehead. A brush that is cut at less than  inch on top may be referred to as a burr. A brush that is cut at  inch or longer on top, and especially one that shows natural curl, depending on length,  may  be referred to as a  short brush cut  or  brush cut. Brush cuts are traditionally groomed with hair control wax, commonly referred to as brush wax.

Culture

A butch cut is commonly used to describe a woman who is masculine usually a lesbian, primarily in LGBT slang. Since the lesbian subculture of 1940s America, "butch" has been present as a way for lesbians to circumvent traditional genders of women in society and distinguish their masculine attributes and characteristics from feminine women. According to some academic studies about the butch/femme subculture, "Femmes were sometimes bisexual."

Butch cuts are commonly used in various militaries, either as form of social conformity to the military or as a hygienic measure. Conversely many punk cultures and movements have likewise adopted butch haircuts as a form of personal identity and of rebellion.

See also
List of hairstyles
Buzz cut
Crew cut
Ivy League
Flattop
Regular haircut

References

Bibliography

External links
 
Butch Cut High School Football Player,  Lawrence, Kansas, 1960
 Butch Cut High School Football Player,  Lawrence, Kansas, 1960
 Butch Cut High School Football Player,  Lawrence, Kansas, 1960
Butch Cut Central High School Student,   Little Rock, Arkansas, 1958
Butch Cut Track and Field Athlete, Summer Olympics, Rome, Italy, 1960
 

Hairstyles
1950s fashion
1960s fashion
2000s fashion
2010s fashion
2020s fashion

ko:스포츠 머리